Aristobia hispida is a species of beetle in the family Cerambycidae. It was described by Saunders in 1853, originally under the genus Cerosterna. It is known from Taiwan, China and Vietnam.

References

Lamiini
Beetles described in 1853